Edmund Richard "Hoot" Gibson (August 6, 1892 – August 23, 1962) was an American rodeo champion, film actor, film director, and producer. While acting and stunt work began as a sideline to Gibson's focus on rodeo, he successfully transitioned from silent films to become a leading performer in Hollywood's growing cowboy film industry. 

During the period between World War I and World War II, he was second only to cowboy film legend Tom Mix as a box office draw. He has a star on the Hollywood Walk of Fame and was inducted into the Western Performers Hall of Fame at the National Cowboy & Western Heritage Museum.

Early life 
Born Edmund Richard Gibson in Tekamah, Nebraska, he learned to ride a horse as a young boy. His family moved to California when he was seven years old. As a teenager, he worked with horses on a ranch, which led to competition on bucking broncos at area rodeos.

Given the nickname "Hoot Owl" by co-workers, the name evolved to just "Hoot". (Michael Wallis' book, The Real Wild West: The 101 Ranch and the Creation of the American West, says that Gibson "picked up the nickname 'Hoot' while working as a bicycle messenger for Owl Drug Company." Dan L. Thrapp's Encyclopedia of Frontier Biography says that Gibson "is said to have been nicknamed because he once hunted owls in a cave.") Hoot, himself, stated in an episode of "You Bet Your Life" (January 19. 1956), that he acquired the nickname "Hoot", when he used to look for hoot owls in caves as a child in Nebraska.

Career 
In 1910, film director Francis Boggs was looking for experienced cowboys to appear in his silent film Pride of the Range. Gibson and Tom Mix, another future star of Western films, were hired. Gibson made a second film for Boggs in 1911. After a deranged employee killed Boggs, director Jack Conway hired Gibson to appear in his 1912 Western His Only Son. 

Acting for Gibson was then a minor sideline, and he continued competing in rodeos to make a living. In 1912, he won the all-around championship at the famous Pendleton Round-Up in Pendleton, Oregon and the steer roping world championship at the Calgary Stampede.

Gibson's career was temporarily interrupted with service in the United States Army during World War I as a sergeant in the Tank Corps. When the war ended, he returned to the rodeo business and became good friends with Art Acord, a fellow cowboy and movie actor. The two participated in summer rodeo, then went back to Hollywood for the winter to do stunt work. For several years, Gibson had secondary film roles (primarily in Westerns) with stars such as Harry Carey. By 1921, the demand for cowboy pictures was so great, Gibson began receiving offers for leading roles. Some of these offers came from up-and-coming film director John Ford, with whom Gibson developed a lasting friendship and working relationship.

Financial difficulties and later life

From the 1920s through the 1940s, Gibson was a major film attraction, ranking second only to Tom Mix as a Western film box-office draw. He successfully made the transition to sound films, and as a result, became a highly paid performer. After being released by Universal Pictures in the early 1930s, he signed a contract with the Poverty Row outfit Allied Pictures, making a series of profitable releases for the company. He appeared in his own comic books and was popular until singing cowboys such as Gene Autry and Roy Rogers displaced him.

In 1927, Gibson, and five other California businessmen sponsored The Spirit of Los Angeles, a modification of the International CF-10 for an attempt at winning the Dole Air Derby. Gibson had his name painted on the nose for publicity. The aircraft crashed in the San Francisco Bay before the start of the race. In 1933, Gibson injured himself when he crashed his plane while racing cowboy star Ken Maynard in the National Air Races. Later, the two friends teamed to make a series of low-budget movies in the twilight of their careers.

Gibson's years of substantial earnings did not see him through his retirement. He had squandered much of his income on high living and poor investments. By the 1950s, Gibson faced financial ruin, in part due to costly medical bills from serious health problems. To get by and pay his bills, he earned money as a greeter at a Las Vegas casino. For a time, he worked in a carnival and took virtually any job his dwindling name value could obtain. At one point he hosted a booth at rodeos that encouraged ranchers to raise nutria. He also appeared in an episode of Groucho's You Bet Your Life, filmed in December 1955. He made the final game with his contestant, but did not win the big money, though he earned himself a share of the $440 prize money for the show.

Personal life
On September 6, 1913, Gibson married Rose August Wenger, a rodeo performer. They had met at the Pendleton Round-Up in Oregon sometime between 1911 and 1913. Under the name Helen Gibson, she became a major film star in her own right for a time, notably in the lead role of The Hazards of Helen. Census records for 1920 indicate they were living separately; Hoot Gibson listed himself as married; Helen listed herself as widowed.

Gibson married vaudeville actress Helen Johnson on April 20, 1922, in Riverside, California. They had one child, Lois Charlotte Gibson. They were divorced on February 2, 1929, in Hollywood, California.

The fact that Hoot Gibson was consecutively married to two women who used the name Helen Gibson in some fashion has led to a good deal of confusion.

Gibson married film actress Sally Eilers on June 28, 1930. The marriage ended in 1933.

Gibson married a final time to Dorothy Dunstan, a 22-year-old yodeler, on July 3, 1942.

Death
Hoot Gibson died of cancer in 1962 in Woodland Hills, California at age 70, and was interred in the Inglewood Park Cemetery in Inglewood, California.

Legacy
In 1960, for his contribution to film, Gibson was inducted to the Hollywood Walk of Fame and was honored with a star at 1765 Vine Street in the Motion Pictures section. In 1979, he was inducted into the Western Performers Hall of Fame at the National Cowboy & Western Heritage Museum in Oklahoma City, Oklahoma.

In popular culture
References to Gibson in American media include:

From Here to Eternity (1951): "'I wonder,' he said,' what ever happened to old Hoot Gibson? I can just barely remember him. My God, he had grey hair when I was just a kid."
The Carpetbaggers (1961): "'The Bijou's got a new Hoot Gibson picture,' Tommy said."
 The Bullwinkle Show: Hoot Gibson is mentioned in "The Lion and the Aardvark" episode of Aesop and Son.
The Beverly Hillbillies (1963): A phony relative Jake Clampett manipulates the Clampett family into pursuing Hollywood dreams in an attempt to further his own filmmaking ambitions. Granny is on to him when he isn't familiar with Hoot Gibson, but Jake wins her over by promising her a role in a Hoot Gibson picture. 
Petticoat Junction (1966): In Season 3 Episode 27, "Second Honeymoon", Charlie and Floyd (The Cannonball engineers) are discussing the poetic quote, "As each returning spring renews the promise of youth, so a second honeymoon renews the dream of love in two blissful hearts." Charlie attributes the quote to Hoot Gibson. Charlie adds, "He said it to his horse."
Myra Breckinridge (1968): "More than ever was Buck, revoltingly, the Singin' Shootin' Cowboy, so inferior in every way to Hoot Gibson."
 Laverne & Shirley (1977): Hoot Gibson is mentioned in "Guilty Until Proven Not Innocent" Season 2 Episode 11. Shirley exclaims, "Good God! It’s the devil and Hoot Gibson!"
Fried Green Tomatoes at the Whistle Stop Cafe (1987): "Most of those guards are pretty simpleminded old boys ... they'll go to a picture show and see Tom Mix or Hoot Gibson and then they come back and ride around the farm, pulling their guns, trying to be cowboys."

Filmography

References

External links

 
 Hoot Gibson at b-westerns.com
 Photographs of Hoot Gibson

1892 births
1962 deaths
People from Tekamah, Nebraska
Male actors from Nebraska
American male film actors
American film producers
American male silent film actors
American stunt performers
Burials at Inglewood Park Cemetery
Deaths from cancer in California
Male Western (genre) film actors
20th-century American male actors
All-Around
Roping (rodeo)
Articles containing video clips